Giordania is a small Malagasy genus of potter wasps. The genus was created by Josef Gusenleitner in 1995.

References

Biological pest control wasps
Potter wasps